Ribeira is a municipality in the state of São Paulo in Brazil. The population is 3,330 (2020 est.) in an area of 336 km2. The elevation is 167 m.

References

Municipalities in São Paulo (state)